Indian Institute of Information Technology, Dharwad (IIITDWD) is an Institute of National Importance set up under a non-profit, Public-Private-Partnership (PPP) model by the Ministry of Human Resource Development (India). It is an academic and research institute partially funded by the Government of India, the Government of Karnataka and industry partner KEONICS.

Organisation and administration
IIIT Dharwad is an autonomous institution headed by a chairperson with a board of governors, and a senate. IIIT Dharwad is a self-sustaining PPP Institute where all running expenses including salaries are met by the tuition and other fees paid by students.

Academics

Programmes
IIIT Dharwad offers Bachelor of Technology (B.Tech) and doctoral programs in following academic disciplines:

Admissions
Admissions to undergraduate programs are made through Joint Seat Allocation Authority counselling process on the basis of marks obtained by the candidates in JEE-Main. Admissions for doctoral programs are made through a screening test followed by an interview

Campus
The institute started functioning in 2015 in a temporary campus at IT Park in Hubli, and Prime Minister Narendra Modi laid the foundation stone for the construction of permanent campus buildings at Tadasinakoppa village near Dharwad in February 2019.

As of November 2021, construction of permanent campus for IIIT Dharwad is completed and academic operations have begun. The permanent campus of IIIT Dharwad is spread across 60 acre with academic block comprising 30 classrooms. Hostels for students are also constructed.

References 

Engineering colleges in Dharwad
Universities and colleges in Dharwad
Dharwad
Educational institutions established in 2015
2015 establishments in Karnataka